The Gandhi–King Award for Nonviolence is presented by The World Movement for Nonviolence. The award is named after Mahatma Gandhi and Dr. Martin Luther King Jr.

1999 Kofi Annan
2000 Nelson Mandela
2001 Jane Goodall
2002 Mata Amritanandamayi
2003 Mwai Kibaki

Memorials to Mahatma Gandhi
Memorials to Martin Luther King Jr.